Retro Grave is an American hard rock band formed in 2006 by Jeff Olson, original drummer for doom metal band Trouble.

In 2006, Olson formed Retro Grave while still the drummer for Trouble. The band's debut self-titled EP was released on June 5, 2007, and was written, recorded, and performed entirely by Olson alongside lyricist Paull Goodchild. The band's debut full-length album, Again, was released on February 9, 2010, with guest musicians.

Olson has been collaborating with various musicians for the band's second album, titled Skullduggery.

Members

Current members 
Jeff Olson – drums, vocals, keyboards, brass, strings
J. Cortes – bass, backing vocals
Michael Leonard Maiewski – guitar

Former members 
Michael Schermuly – guitar (2008–2009)

Discography

Studio albums
Again (2010)

EPs
Retro Grave (2007)

References 

https://retrogravemusic.com/home

External links
Official Retro Grave website

American doom metal musical groups
Musical groups established in 2006